DTDP-3-amino-3,6-dideoxy-alpha-D-glucopyranose transaminase (TylB, TDP-3-keto-6-deoxy-D-glucose 3-aminotransferase, TDP-3-dehydro-6-deoxy-D-glucose 3-aminotransferase, dTDP-3-keto-6-deoxy-D-glucose 3-aminotransferase, dTDP-3-dehydro-6-deoxy-D-glucose 3-aminotransferase) is an enzyme with systematic name dTDP-3-amino-3,6-dideoxy-alpha-D-glucopyranose:2-oxoglutarate aminotransferase. This enzyme catalyses the following chemical reaction

 dTDP-3-amino-3,6-dideoxy-alpha-D-glucopyranose + 2-oxoglutarate  dTDP-3-dehydro-6-deoxy-alpha-D-glucopyranose + L-glutamate

This enzyme is a pyridoxal-phosphate protein.

References

External links 
 

EC 2.6.1